Pločice  is a village in Croatia. It is connected by the D516 state street.

Populated places in Dubrovnik-Neretva County
Konavle